The men's 200 metre breaststroke competition of the swimming events at the 2015 Southeast Asian Games was held on 6 June at the OCBC Aquatic Centre in Singapore.

Schedule

Records

Results

Final

The final was held on 6 June.

References

External links
 

Men's 200 metre breaststroke